Anastasiia Yeva Domani is a Ukrainian LGBT+ activist and co-founder of Cohort, a Ukrainian transgender rights organisation.

Before transitioning, Domani worked as a sports journalist and was a noted supporter of football club Dynamo Kyiv. After realising that she was trans, she began organising local gatherings of other trans people. In 2017, she began working for LGBT+ rights organisation Insight. In 2020, she co-founded Cohort.

References 

Ukrainian LGBT rights activists
Ukrainian transgender people